Marrying Mr. Perfect is a 2012 Hong Kong romantic comedy film directed by Wong Jing.

Cast
Gigi Leung
Ronald Cheng
Chapman To
Xie Na
Eric Tsang
Stanley Fung

References

Films directed by Wong Jing
2012 romantic comedy films
2012 films
Hong Kong romantic comedy films
2010s Cantonese-language films
2010s Hong Kong films